John Carter of Mars is  the eleventh and final book in the  Barsoom series by American writer Edgar Rice Burroughs. It is not a novel, but rather a collection of two John Carter of Mars stories.

The first story was originally published in 1940 by Whitman as a Better Little Book entitled John Carter of Mars.  Although credited to Edgar Rice Burroughs, it was written (and illustrated) by his son, John Coleman Burroughs and was later expanded and re-published in the January issue of Amazing Stories in 1941 as "John Carter and the Giant of Mars", the name it goes under in the collection.

The second story, "Skeleton Men of Jupiter", was first published in Amazing Stories in 1943. Intended as the first in a series of novelettes to be later collected in book form, in the fashion of Llana of Gathol, it ends with the plot unresolved, and the intended sequels were never written. Several other writers have written pastiche endings for the story.

The first edition of John Carter of Mars (a title that Burroughs never used for any book in the Barsoom series) was published in 1964 by Canaveral Press, fourteen years after his death.

Reception
This book is not highly regarded by fans of the Barsoom series and is generally considered something of an afterthought. However, in the book Master of Adventure: The Worlds of Edgar Rice Burroughs, Richard A. Lupoff, the editor of the 1964 Canaveral Press edition of John Carter of Mars, writes that it is interesting for its contrast between "real" Burroughs (Skeleton Men of Jupiter) and "ersatz" Burroughs (John Carter and the Giant of Mars).

Copyright
The copyright for this book has expired in Australia, and thus now resides in the public domain there. The text is available via Project Gutenberg Australia.

References

External links
ERBzine C.H.A.S.E.R ENCYCLOPEDIA entry for ''John Carter of Mars
 
Text file of "John Carter and the Giant of Mars" at Project Gutenberg Australia Zip file
Text file of "Skeleton Men of Jupiter" at Project Gutenberg Australia Zip file
Edgar Rice Burroughs Summary Project page for "John Carter and the Giant of Mars"
Edgar Rice Burroughs Summary Project page for "Skeleton Men of Jupiter"

Martian novels by Edgar Rice Burroughs
Short story collections by Edgar Rice Burroughs
Fantasy short story collections
Science fiction short story collections
Fiction set on Jupiter
1964 short story collections